Gold Medallion may refer to:

 Gold medallion tree, a tropical tree from Brazil with yellow flowers, scientifically named Cassia leptophylla
 Gold Retirement Medallion of the U.S. Central Intelligence Agency
 Gold Medallion Book Award, former name of the Christian Book Award, given by the Evangelical Christian Publishers Association
 Sternberg Interfaith Gold Medallion, UK award for interfaith understanding
 Melampodium divaricatum, a flowering plant in the family Asteraceae, commonly known as gold medallion

See also
 Gold (disambiguation)
 Medallion (disambiguation)
 Bronze Medallion (disambiguation)
 Silver Medallion (disambiguation)
 Gold medal